Mark Radford may refer to:

 Mark Radford (basketball) (born 1959), American former National Basketball Association player
 Mark Radford (footballer) (born 1968), English former footballer